Skopsko is the most popular beer in North Macedonia. It has 64% of the market in North Macedonia. It was the first commercial beer, the best-known and best-selling beer brand in the country. Once a "Best of Macedonia" has become "Our Best" and "Skopsko, and everything is possible" - are its most famous slogans.

History 
The Skopje brewery was founded in 1922 and began operations in 1924. In 1998, it was purchased by the Greek Coca-Cola Bottling Company and Heineken.

Skopsko was introduced with the name "Light Beer" and it presented beer liner with 10% extract. Before World War II, the name of the beer was changed to "An Export Beer from Skopje" ("Скопљанско Експортно Пиво") with increased extract of 12%. By the early 1990s the name "Skopsko" was placed in the center of the label.

 1991—Skopsko was rebranded.
 1996—Brewery Skopje was added to the label
 1999—new label
 2004—new label
 2005—new packaging
 December 2014 - production of dark beer started

Ingredients 
The basic ingredients of this beer are water, a starch source, such as malted barley, able to be saccharified (converted to sugars) then fermented (converted into alcohol and carbon dioxide). The beer has a golden yellow color and a white foam. The characteristic bitter taste comes from hops.

External links 
 Brewery Skopje

 Official website of the beer

References 

Macedonian drinks